Kocahasanlı is a town in Mersin Province, Turkey

Geography 
Kocahasanlı is a part of Erdemli district of Mersin Province.

People and History 
Although there are ruins around the town, the town itself is quite young. The population of Kocahasanlı is composed of Yörüks who were nomadic Turkmens. In 1952 the village was relocated to its present location. But there is also a group of families which had moved from Bulgaria as a result of ethnical repression of the Bulgarian government against Turks during 1950 s. In 1972, Kocahasanlı was declared a seat of township.

Economy 
The main economic activity is green house vegetable agriculture. The town also produces citrus and bananas.

References 

Populated coastal places in Turkey
Populated places in Mersin Province
Towns in Turkey
Tourist attractions in Mersin Province
Populated places in Erdemli District